Ka with stroke (Ҟ ҟ; italics: Ҟ ҟ) is a letter of the Cyrillic script. It is formed from the Cyrillic letter Ka (К к) by adding a stroke through the upper part of the vertical stem of the letter. 

Ka with stroke is used in the alphabet of the Abkhaz language to represent the uvular ejective .

Computing codes

See also
Ꝁ ꝁ : K with stroke
Cyrillic characters in Unicode

Cyrillic letters with diacritics
Letters with stroke